"I'm Holding My Own" is a song written by Tony Arata, and recorded by American country music singer Lee Roy Parnell.  It was released in January 1994 as the second single from his album On the Road.  The song spent 20 weeks on the Hot Country Songs charts, peaking at number three in 1994.

Content
The narrator runs into his ex-lover on the street and they talk about how they have been doing since the breakup. She states that while she is with another man there is a chance for them to get back together. The narrator states that he is doing alright by himself.

Music video
The music video was directed by Michael Oblowitz and premiered in early 1994. The video was filmed in and around New York City.

Chart performance
"I'm Holding My Own" debuted at number 71 on the U.S. Billboard Hot Country Singles & Tracks for the week of January 8, 1994.

Year-end charts

References

1994 singles
1993 songs
Lee Roy Parnell songs
Songs written by Tony Arata
Song recordings produced by Scott Hendricks
Arista Nashville singles